Hot Docs at Home is a Canadian television programming block, which premiered April 16, 2020 on CBC Television. Introduced as a special series during the COVID-19 pandemic in Canada, the series aired several feature documentary films that had been scheduled to premiere at the 2020 Hot Docs Canadian International Documentary Festival before its postponement. The films aired on CBC Television at 8 p.m. EST on Thursdays and on the CBC's Documentary Channel later the same evening, and were made available for streaming on the CBC Gem platform.

During the same period, the Documentary Channel also aired a number of older documentary films which were screened at past editions of the Hot Docs festival.

Several of the films broadcast on the series received Canadian Screen Award nominations in television documentary categories at the 9th Canadian Screen Awards in 2021, with 9/11 Kids winning the Donald Brittain Award for best social or political documentary.

Schedule
Films broadcast on the series were:
 April 16: Made You Look: A True Story About Fake Art - Barry Avrich
 April 23: 9/11 Kids - Elizabeth St. Phillip
 April 30: Finding Sally - Tamara Mariam Dawit
 May 7: Meat the Future - Liz Marshall
 May 14: They Call Me Dr. Miami - Jean-Simon Chartier
 May 21: Influence - Richard Poplak and Diana Neille
 May 28: The Walrus and the Whistleblower - Nathalie Bibeau

References

2020 Canadian television series debuts
2020s Canadian documentary television series
Canadian motion picture television series
CBC Television original programming
Television series impacted by the COVID-19 pandemic
Cultural responses to the COVID-19 pandemic
Television programming blocks in Canada
2020 Canadian television series endings
2020s Canadian anthology television series